The Flintstones & WWE: Stone Age SmackDown! is a 2015 American direct-to-video animated film starring The Flintstones. It is the second co-production between Warner Bros. Animation and WWE Studios following Scooby-Doo! WrestleMania Mystery. The film features Fred Flintstone, Barney Rubble and the whole Bedrock gang with stone age versions of WWE Superstars and Divas. It was released on March 10, 2015, by Warner Home Video.

It is the first new Flintstones production in over 14 years since The Flintstones: On the Rocks, 55 years after the original 1960s series and also the first Flintstones film without the original creators William Hanna and Joseph Barbera, who both died respectively in 2001 and 2006. The film marked the first time the character of Mr. Slate was voiced by someone other than John Stephenson who later died of Alzheimer's disease on May 15, 2015. This was also Russi Taylor's last film before her death on July 26, 2019. The film was directed by Spike Brandt and Tony Cervone.

Plot
Fred Flintstone has promised his wife Wilma they will take a vacation. He wants to request days off work and money from his boss Mr. Slate who just then is hiring an indirect relative named John Cenastone. After getting into trouble, Fred is saved by Cenastone. Fred does not receive money from Mr. Slate, and Fred does not know how to tell Wilma the bad news. At a fair organized by the Lodge of the Water Buffaloes, Fred devises a way to earn money: he enlists Hoppy, the "hoparoo" of his friend Barney Rubble, to challenge people to boxing matches. When they arrive, among other attractions are the Boulder Twins who open a kissing booth causing jealousy in Fred and Barney's wives Wilma and Betty.

Hoppy defeats many people, but his winning streak ends when the ruffian CM Punkrock humiliates him. Angered, Barney challenges Punkrock and defeats him. Punkrock exits angrily with his teammate Marble Henry. Fred envisions a great opportunity to earn even more money with wrestling after the success of Barney's performance. They are greeted by a seafood seller named Mr. McMagma and they decide to organize an event at an abandoned circus.

Fred asks Cenastone to recruit more wrestlers. He brings Rey Mysteriopal, a masked clerk; and The Undertaker, a somber gravedigger. The event begins between Cenastone and Mysteriopal, as they are on friendly terms, the fight fails. Fred decides that Barney should wrestle against Undertaker. Barney protests, but Fred presses him. Just when Barney is about to win the match, Wilma and Betty arrive and scold their husbands. Everything is resolved, especially because Fred has earned enough money.

However, Fred aspires to more, inspired by McMagma, and decided to organize a second event. Fred rents the Bedrock Stadium. He promotes a rematch between Barney and Punkrock. Punkrock accepts and Fred also enlists Henry and the Boulder Twins. However, Barney does not agree to participate. Fred leaves without him, starting his show. Mysteriopal and Cenastone fight again, but people are cheering for Barney. Fred announces that Barney will not fight. The other fighters exit, disappointed that Fred has neglected his friend and leaving Fred to face the opponents alone.

Fred takes courage and faces Punkrock and his allies in the wrestling ring, but he is brutalized. Seeing his friend's sacrifice, Barney decides to go and face Punkrock, encouraging other wrestlers to participate. Even Wilma and Betty intimidate the Boulders and Barney and Betty's son Bamm-Bamm easily defeats Henry. Fred and Barney and their team win to great applause.

Fred decides to quit wrestling. He takes his profits and sells the idea to McMagma. At the end, the Flintstones, the Rubbles, and the wrestlers enjoy their vacations.

Cast
 Jeff Bergman as Fred Flintstone
 Kevin Michael Richardson as Barney Rubble
 Tress MacNeille as Wilma Flintstone
 Grey Griffin as Betty Rubble
 Russi Taylor as Pebbles Flintstone
 Eric Bauza as Dino, Hoppy, Bamm-Bamm Rubble
 John O'Hurley as Mr. Slate
 Brie Bella as Brie Boulder
 Nikki Bella as Nikki Boulder
 Daniel Bryan as Daniel Bryrock
 John Cena as John Cenastone
 Mark Henry as Marble Henry
 Vince McMahon as Mr. McMagma
 Rey Mysterio as Rey Mysteriopal
 CM Punk as CM Punkrock
 The Undertaker as himself

Additional Voices by Doug Erholtz, Charlie Hewson, and Tom Kenny.

Development
According to Daniel Bryan, the wrestlers recorded their lines during SummerSlam in 2013. Collette Sunderman was the casting and voice director. Also, this was the last WWE-related project CM Punk did until returning to be a contributor for WWE Backstage, and it was actually released over a year after his unfavorable departure from the company, but by the time he left, production and development of the movie was too far along to edit him out in any way without causing significant delays.

Reception
A review from Indiewire calls the film "a brand-new release that so meticulously recaptures the salad days of Hanna-Barbera (that it) only makes one yearn for more Flintstones cartoons".

Home media
The film was initially released on DVD and Blu-Ray on March 10, 2015.  On August 4, 2020, it was included in the DVD collection The Flintstones: 2 Movies & 5 Specials.

References

External links

 

2015 direct-to-video films
2015 animated films
2015 films
2010s American animated films
American television films
Animated crossover films
Films directed by Spike Brandt
Films directed by Tony Cervone
2010s English-language films
Direct-to-video professional wrestling films
The Flintstones films
Warner Bros. direct-to-video animated films
WWE Home Video
WWE Studios films
Cultural depictions of wrestlers
Cultural depictions of The Undertaker
2010s children's animated films